Julie Halard-Decugis and Ai Sugiyama were the defending champions, but none competed this year.

Cara Black and Elena Likhovtseva won the title by defeating Jelena Dokic and Nadia Petrova 6–0, 3–6, 6–2 in the final.

Seeds

Draw

Draw

References

External links
 Official results archive (ITF)
 Official results archive (WTA)

Pilot Pen Tennis
Connecticut Open (tennis)
2001 Pilot Pen Tennis